The following articles cover the presidential trips made by Barack Obama while he was President of the United States:
 List of international presidential trips made by Barack Obama
 List of presidential trips made by Barack Obama (2009)
 List of presidential trips made by Barack Obama (2010)
 List of presidential trips made by Barack Obama (2011)
 List of presidential trips made by Barack Obama (2012)
 List of presidential trips made by Barack Obama (2013)
 List of presidential trips made by Barack Obama (2014)
 List of presidential trips made by Barack Obama (2015)
 List of presidential trips made by Barack Obama (2016–17)

Trips
Obama, Barack
2000s in the United States
2010s in the United States
Barack Obama-related lists